Progress M-61, identified by NASA as Progress 26P, was a Progress spacecraft used to resupply the International Space Station. It was a Progress-M 11F615A55 spacecraft, with the serial number 361.

Launch
Progress M-61 was launched by a Soyuz-U carrier rocket from Site 1/5 at the Baikonur Cosmodrome. Launch occurred at 17:33:47 UTC on 2 August 2007.

Docking
The spacecraft docked with the Pirs module at 18:40 UTC on 5 August 2007. It remained docked for almost 139 days before undocking at 03:59 UTC on 22 December 2007. Following undocking it conducted technological experiments and research as part of the Plazma-Progress programme for a month prior to being deorbited. It was deorbited at 19:06 UTC on 22 January 2008. The spacecraft burned up in the atmosphere over the Pacific Ocean, with any remaining debris landing in the ocean at around 19:51 UTC.

Progress M-61 carried supplies to the International Space Station, including food, water and oxygen for the crew and equipment for conducting scientific research.

See also

 List of Progress flights
 Uncrewed spaceflights to the International Space Station

References

Spacecraft launched in 2007
Spacecraft which reentered in 2008
Progress (spacecraft) missions
Supply vehicles for the International Space Station
Spacecraft launched by Soyuz-U rockets